Silvia Felipo Suñe (born 4 February 1967) is an Andorran middle-distance runner. She competed in the 1500 metres at the 2000 Summer Olympics and the 2004 Summer Olympics.

Notes

References

External links
 

1967 births
Living people
Andorran female middle-distance runners
Olympic athletes of Andorra
Athletes (track and field) at the 2000 Summer Olympics
Athletes (track and field) at the 2004 Summer Olympics
European Games competitors for Andorra
Athletes (track and field) at the 2015 European Games
Place of birth missing (living people)